The Ora White Cat also known as the R2 is a battery electric city car produced by the Chinese car manufacturer Great Wall Motors under its electric vehicle brand Ora from 2020 to 2022.

History
In June 2019, Ora presented the R2 EV Concept study as a preview of the third model in the production line of vehicles of this subsidiary of Great Wall Motors. The car was characterized as a more comfortable alternative to the budget model R1. At the rear, there is a glass pane optically forming one part with a strip of LED lamps running across the width of the body, supplemented by additional lamps in the bumper.

The model was formally released on July 15, 2020 and renamed the White Cat for production.

Specifications
The White Cat is offered in two versions equipped with a 34kWh or 38kW battery, with a claimed NEDC range of 360km and 401km, respectively. The 360km model is equipped with a 35kW/48hp motor with a max torque of 125Nm, whereas the 401km model is equipped with a 45kW/61hp motor with a max torque of 130Nm.

References

External links

R2
Cars introduced in 2020
City cars
Front-wheel-drive vehicles
Hatchbacks
Electric city cars
Production electric cars